Mountain Empire Baptist School was a private Baptist K-12 Christian school, and was a ministry of Belle Meadows Baptist Church. Started in 2001, it was member of the Tennessee Association of Christian Schools. 

With old fashioned style worship and preaching from the King James Bible (1611), it was a Baptist school without apologizing for doctrine, heritage, nor for zeal. 

Their goal was to not take the place of the Christian home, but seek to complement it. The curriculum used for all grades was A Beka. Subjects were taught from a Biblical viewpoint and were based upon the firm foundation of spiritual truth. Social development was encouraged through the teaching of good manners, high moral standards, respect for parents and authority, and patriotism.

Athletics
8 man football       
2007 TAACS Tennessee State Champions

MEBS Retired Numbers
11  - Andrew King  06-10 Basketball(all-time leading scorer), Football, Baseball
10 - Charli Fricker volleyball, basketball.

References

Baptist schools in the United States
Bristol, Tennessee
Christian schools in Tennessee
Defunct Christian schools in the United States
Educational institutions disestablished in 2010
Educational institutions established in 2001
Defunct schools in Tennessee
2001 establishments in Tennessee
2010 disestablishments in Tennessee